Ouwo Moussa Maâzou (born 25 August 1988) commonly known as Moussa Maâzou, is a Nigerien professional footballer who plays as a striker for French amateur club FC Bassin Piennois.

Career
Maazou began his senior career as a player with Niger's Army club, ASFAN of Niamey. In 2005–2006 Maazou scored 17 goals. In the 2006–2007 season with ASFAN, he scored 20 goals in 34 matches.
In January 2008,  Belgian side Sporting Lokeren signed him. He scored six goals in his first nine matches. On 3 January 2009, Maâzou signed a contract with CSKA Moscow. The club paid Sporting Lokeren €4.8 million for Maâzou. He was immediately loaned back to Lokeren until 1 July 2009. After CSKA qualified for the round of 16 of the UEFA Cup 2008–09, he was called back from the loan and on 12 March 2009 was registered as a CSKA player. In January 2010 Maâzou left Russia, signing a six-month loan deal, with an option for a permanent move when his loan spell ends, with AS Monaco. The following season Maâzou joined FC Girondins de Bordeaux on a one-year loan, again with an option to purchase. At the end of January 2011 Maâzou returned to AS Monaco on another six-month, but after only one game injured his knee in training and would require surgery.

In February 2012, Maâzou signed for Le Mans on a six-month loan deal, before moving to Tunisian side Étoile du Sahel on a three-year contract during the summer of 2012. After terminating his contract with Tunisian side Étoile du Sahel, Maâzou signed for Vitória Guimarães in Portugal in July 2013.

He switched to another Portuguese club, Marítimo in August 2014. On 28 January 2015, at that point the Portuguese top flight's second top goalscorer of the season with nine goals, Maâzou transferred to Chinese Super League side Changchun Yatai.

In February 2016, Maâzou  moved to Danish side Randers.

In July 2016, AC Ajaccio announced the signing of Maâzou on a one-year deal, with an option of a further year.

A year later, on 31 August 2017, Maâzou signed for RC Lens on a three-year contract.
In December 2018, he agreed a mutual termination of his contract with RC Lens.

On 23 September 2019 signed the Israeli Premier League club Sektzia Ness Ziona.

International career
In April 2015, Maâzou announced his retirement from the Niger national football team at the age of 26, after having earned 30 caps and scored seven international goals. He credited the dismissal of manager Gernot Rohr in the previous October as a reason for his decision.

However, in October returned to the national team, scoring two goals against Somalia national football team in the campaign for 2018 World Cup.

International goals
Scores and results list Niger's goal tally first.

References

External links
 
 
 
 

1988 births
Living people
People from Niamey
Nigerien footballers
Niger international footballers
Nigerien expatriate footballers
Association football forwards
AS FAN players
K.S.C. Lokeren Oost-Vlaanderen players
PFC CSKA Moscow players
AS Monaco FC players
FC Girondins de Bordeaux players
S.V. Zulte Waregem players
Le Mans FC players
Étoile Sportive du Sahel players
Vitória S.C. players
C.S. Marítimo players
Changchun Yatai F.C. players
AC Ajaccio players
Ohod Club players
Sektzia Ness Ziona F.C. players
Jeunesse Esch players
FC Differdange 03 players
Chinese Super League players
Ligue 1 players
Ligue 2 players
Russian Premier League players
Belgian Pro League players
Primeira Liga players
Saudi Professional League players
Expatriate footballers in Belgium
Expatriate footballers in Russia
Expatriate footballers in Monaco
Expatriate footballers in France
Expatriate footballers in Tunisia
Expatriate footballers in Portugal
Expatriate footballers in China
Expatriate men's footballers in Denmark
Expatriate footballers in Saudi Arabia
Expatriate footballers in Israel
Expatriate footballers in Luxembourg
2012 Africa Cup of Nations players
2013 Africa Cup of Nations players
Nigerien expatriate sportspeople in Belgium
Nigerien expatriate sportspeople in Russia
Nigerien expatriate sportspeople in France
Nigerien expatriate sportspeople in Tunisia
Nigerien expatriate sportspeople in Portugal
Nigerien expatriate sportspeople in China
Nigerien expatriate sportspeople in Denmark
Nigerien expatriate sportspeople in Saudi Arabia
Nigerien expatriate sportspeople in Israel
Nigerien expatriate sportspeople in Luxembourg